"Fragments of a Hologram Rose" is a science fiction short story by William Gibson. It was Gibson's first published work, originally appearing in 1977 in Unearth, a short-lived science fiction collection magazine which retailed for $1.00; Gibson was paid $23 for the story. It tells the story of a jilted ex-lover who relies on artificial sense-recordings to sleep, in a dark, polluted city. It was subsequently published in Burning Chrome, a collection of Gibson's early short fiction.

References

External links
"Fragments of a Hologram Rose" at the William Gibson Aleph

1977 short stories
Cyberpunk short stories
Short stories by William Gibson
Holography in fiction